The following list of Montreal music venues indicates significant performance locations in Montreal:

Indie

 Casa Del Popolo
 La Sala Rossa
 Mile End Cultural Centre
 Divan Orange (closed)
 Mademoiselle
 Club Lambi (closed)
 Le Belmont
 Café Campus
 Petit Campus
 The Corona Theatre / Théâtre Corona
 Barfly
 O Patro Vys
 La Tulipe
 Le National
 Cabaret Juste Pour Rire (closed)
 Salon Il Motore
 Théâtre Fairmount (formerly Cabaret du Mile-End)
 Centre St-Ambroise
 The Rialto Theatre / Théâtre Rialto
 CFC
 Mission Santa Cruz
 L'Escogriffe
 Théatre Plaza
 Ukrainian Federation
 Sat
 Cabaret Underworld
 Théâtre Telus
 Brasserie Beaubien (closed)
 Quai des Brumes
 Bar Le Ritz PDB

Rock
 Bar St-Laurent 2
 L'Abreuvoir
 Pub St. Paul
 Cafe Chaos (Closed)
 Katacombes (Closed)
 Mademoiselle
 Cabaret Just For Laughs (closed)
 Studio Just For Laughs (closed)
 Théâtre Telus
 Petit Campus
 Cafe Campus

Classical 
 Lambda School of Music and Fine Arts
 Église du Très-Saint-Nom-de-Jésus

All ages
 Shaika cafe
 La Sala Rossa
 Club Soda

Chamber music concert halls (500 -)
 Redpath Hall
 Chapelle historique du Bon-Pasteur
 Pollack Hall 
 Tanna Schulich Hall
 Salle Pierre-Mercure
 Salle Claude Champagne
 Salle de récital du CMADQ
 Salle de concert du CMADQ
 La Sala Rossa

1000+ capacity venues

 The Bell Amphitheatre
 Place des Arts
 Centre Pierre Péladeau
 Salle Claude-Champagne
 Club Soda
 Les Foufounes Électriques
 Théâtre Saint-Denis
 Oscar Peterson Concert Hall
 MTelus (formerly known as Métropolis
 The Medley (closed)
 The Rialto Theatre / Théâtre Rialto
 Le Studio
 The Spectrum / Le Spectrum de Montréal (closed)
 L'Olympia
 Théâtre Telus
 New City Gas

See also
 List of Montreal musicians
 List of Montrealers

External links
 Divan Orange's website
 MontrealMusicScene.com
 Jazz Clubs in Montreal with Show Schedules
 Club Soda's website
 Centre St-Ambroise's website
 Cabaret Underworld

 
Music venues
Montreal